List of MPs elected in the 1741 British general election

This is a list of the 558 MPs or Members of Parliament elected  to the 314 constituencies of the Parliament of Great Britain in 1741, the 9th Parliament of Great Britain and their replacements returned at subsequent by-elections, arranged by constituency.

Elections took place    between 30 April 1741 and 11 June 1741.



By-elections 
 List of Great Britain by-elections (1734–54)

See also
 1741 British general election
 List of parliaments of Great Britain
 Unreformed House of Commons

References

 The House of Commons 1715–1754, ed. R Sedgwick  (1970)

External links
 History of Parliament: Members 1715–1754
 History of Parliament: Constituencies 1715–1754

1741
1741
1741 in Great Britain
Lists of Members of the Parliament of Great Britain